Daniel Bartlett Stevens (January 24, 1837February 3, 1924) was an American businessman and Republican politician.  He served 5 years in the Wisconsin State Assembly.

Biography
Stevens was born on January 24, 1837, in Paris, Maine. He moved to Prairie du Chien, Wisconsin, in 1838. Stevens died in 1924 in St. Maries, Idaho.

His son, Willard T. Stevens, was a member of the Wisconsin State Senate.

Career
Stevens was twice a member of the Assembly. He was first elected to the Assembly in 1882 and again in 1908 and 1910. Additionally, Stevens was the town clerk of Beetown, Wisconsin. He was a Republican.

References

External links
 

People from Paris, Maine
People from Prairie du Chien, Wisconsin
People from Beetown, Wisconsin
Republican Party members of the Wisconsin State Assembly
City and town clerks
1837 births
1924 deaths